Arun Kumar Sarmah (born 1 November 1956) was a member of the 14th Lok Sabha of India. He represented the Lakhimpur constituency of Assam and is a member of the Asom Gana Parishad political party.

Political career

From 1978 to 1980, Sarma was General Secretary of College of Veterinary Science Students' Union, Guwahati and from 1980 to 1985 was Member of Central Executive committee  All Assam Students Union.

He represented the Lakhimpur constituency in 11th Lok Sabha and in April 1998, Sarma was elected to Rajya Sabha.

References

External links
 Profile on the Parliament of India's website

1956 births
Asom Gana Parishad politicians
Living people
India MPs 2004–2009
People from Lakhimpur district
India MPs 1996–1997
Lok Sabha members from Assam
Rajya Sabha members from Assam